Tommi Sakari Taimi (born 21 September 1990) is a Finnish professional ice hockey defenseman who is currently playing for Vålerenga Ishockey in Fjordkraftligaen.

Playing career 
Having come through the youth ranks of Ässät, Tommi Taimi played his first SM-liiga game for the club on 16 September 2011 against Lukko, where he recorded his first assist. He scored his first goal on 24 September 2011 against HPK.

In 2014, he took his game abroad, signing with Amur Khabarovsk of the Kontinental Hockey League (KHL), where he spent one year. Back in his native Finland, Taimi strengthened the roster of Liiga side HIFK during the 2015–16 season and in the early stages of the 2016–17 campaign. In November 2016, he accepted an offer from Kunlun Red Star, the Chinese member of the Kontinental Hockey League.

In the 2017–18 season, Taimi began his third KHL campaign with Slovak based, HC Slovan Bratislava. Appearing in just 13 games, Taimi registered 1 assist before opting to return mid-season to his native Finland and joining original club, Ässät, on a multi-year contract on 5 January 2018.

References

External links 
 

1990 births
Living people
Amur Khabarovsk players
Ässät players
Finnish ice hockey people
HIFK (ice hockey) players
HC Kunlun Red Star players
Sportspeople from Pori
HC Slovan Bratislava players
Finnish ice hockey defencemen
Finnish expatriate ice hockey players in China
Finnish expatriate ice hockey players in Slovakia
Finnish expatriate ice hockey players in Russia
Finnish expatriate ice hockey players in Norway